Toxopoda is a genus of flies in the family Sepsidae.

Species
Toxopoda ainne (Vanschuytbroeck, 1961)
Toxopoda angulata Iwasa, 2008
Toxopoda asymmetrica Ozerov, 1992
Toxopoda atrata (Malloch, 1928)
Toxopoda au Ozerov, 1998
Toxopoda bequaerti (Curran, 1929)
Toxopoda cavata Iwasa, 2008
Toxopoda contracta (Walker, 1853)
Toxopoda elephantina Iwasa, 2008
Toxopoda fasciventris Bezzi, 1920
Toxopoda haladai Ozerov, 2018
Toxopoda malayana Iwasa, 2008
Toxopoda mordax Iwasa, Zuska & Ozerov, 1991
Toxopoda nigrifoveata Ozerov, 1991
Toxopoda nitida Macquart, 1851
Toxopoda nuceria (Séguy, 1938)
Toxopoda ozerovi Iwasa, 2008
Toxopoda papuensis Iwasa, 2001
Toxopoda pseudoviduata Ozerov, 2010
Toxopoda saegeri Vanschuytbroeck, 1961
Toxopoda shinonagai Iwasa, 1986
Toxopoda simplex Iwasa, 1986
Toxopoda soror (Munari, 1994)
Toxopoda sulawesiensis Iwasa, 1999
Toxopoda vanschuytbroecki Ozerov, 1991
Toxopoda viduata (Thomson, 1869)
Toxopoda vikhrei Ozerov & Iwasa, 2008

References

Sepsidae
Diptera of Africa
Diptera of Asia
Diptera of Australasia
Brachycera genera
Taxa named by Pierre-Justin-Marie Macquart